MKS IUVENTA Michalovce is a Slovak handball club based in Michalovce, that plays in the Women's Handball International League (WHIL), an international championship organized for Czech and Slovak teams.

European record

Team

Current squad 
Squad for the 2022-23 season
 

Goalkeepers 
 1  Naira Morgana Mendes de Almeida
 14  Barbora Jakubíková
 16  Irina Yablonska-Bobal 
Wingers
LW 
 9  Martina Popovcová
 11  Emma Lukácová
 25  Marina Radović
 88  Lívia Klucková
RW 
 7  Bibiana Štefaniková
 8  Nataliia Dmytrenko
Line players
 22  Lucija Humel
 42  Aleksandra Kolovska
 99  Anastasija Krivokapić

Back players
LB
 3  Alene Dvoršcáková
 10  Karina Soskyda
 33  Iryna Kompaniiets
CB
 6  Barbora Polievková
 17  Andrezza Pazinho Dales dos Santos
 21  Patrícia Wollingerová
RB
 13  Cristina Gheorghe
 18  Yevheniia Kohuch
 19  Yana Borysevych

References

External links
 

Slovak handball clubs
Handball clubs established in 1976
Sport in Košice Region